Tanusree  Makhanlal Sarkar (born 5 September 1998) is a Bengali cricketer. She plays for Bengal and East zone. She has played 4 First-class, 10 List A and 14 Women's Twenty20 matches. She made her debut in major domestic cricket on 6 December 2014 in a one-day match against Hyderabad.

References 

Bengal women cricketers
East Zone women cricketers
1998 births
Living people